Robert Allen Fitzwilliam Gillmor MBE (6 July 1936 – 8 May 2022) was a British ornithologist, artist, illustrator, author, and editor. He was a co-founder of the Society of Wildlife Artists (SWLA) and was its secretary, chairman and president. He contributed to over 100 books, and received numerous awards.

Early life
Gillmor was born on 6 July 1936 and educated at Leighton Park School, Reading and the School of Fine Art at Reading University. He was just 16 when his illustrations were first published, in the monthly magazine British Birds. When he was a student in the art department of Reading University, he illustrated his first book, A Study of Blackbirds. Gillmor taught art and craft at his old school, Leighton Park in Reading, for six years before commencing a freelance career as a wildlife artist in 1965.

Aged 13, he was the first ever junior member elected by the Reading Ornithological Club (later Berkshire Ornithological Club) and went on to illustrate the covers of its annual reports from 1950. He was eventually made the club's life president.

Career

Gillmor's output was enormous and in a variety of forms, line drawing watercolour, lino-cuts and silk screen. After his first book in 1958, his work appeared in over 100 others.

Moving from Reading to Cley next the Sea in Norfolk in 1998 proved an inspiring influence on his work. He resumed making lino-cuts. He was also a keen ornithologist, and served on council for all three of the national organisations, RSPB, British Ornithologists' Union and the British Trust for Ornithology. He designed the first version of the RSPB's Avocet logo. He was a long-standing member (and former president) of the Reading Guild of Artists.

SWLA

After founding the Society of Wildlife Artists with Eric Ennion in the early 1960s, Robert served as its secretary and chairman for many years. He was also elected president in 1984 and served for two five-year periods, he also served as a vice-president of the society. As well as working to promote current work, he did much to promote work of past artists, including Charles Tunnicliffe, (editing three books) and his grandfather, Professor Allen W. Seaby (1867–1953), who instilled in him a love of printmaking.

Later life

In 2011, Gillmor completed lino-cuts for four sets of postage stamps for Royal Mail, with a further three sets (of six stamps each) in 2012. He designed the British Trust for Ornithology's Dilys Breese Medal, first awarded in 2009.

A retrospective of Gillmor's work was exhibited at Reading Museum from 23 October 2011 to 29 April 2012.

In the 2015 Birthday Honours he was appointed a Member of the Order of the British Empire (MBE), "for services to Wildlife Art". His other awards included the RSPB Medal (2001), and the Union Medal of the British Ornithological Union (1997).

He died on 8 May 2022, aged 85, following a lengthy period of ill-health. He is survived by his wife and fellow artist, Susan (née Norman; they married in 1974), and children Emily (also a wildlife artist) and Thomas.

Works

As editor

As art editor 

The Birds of the Western Palaearctic, nine volumes, 1977–1994
Birds of Berkshire, 1996

As illustrator 

 – Gillmor's first book, undertaken while a student

The dust jackets of each of the New Naturalist series since 1985.

References

External links
Sample works on SWLA website
  (Cover illustrator)

1936 births
2022 deaths
English illustrators
English ornithologists
20th-century English painters
English male painters
21st-century English painters
21st-century English male artists
People educated at Leighton Park School
Alumni of the University of Reading
British bird artists
Artists from Reading, Berkshire
People from Cley next the Sea
Members of the Order of the British Empire
20th-century English male artists